Buttes of the Cross is two sandstone summits located in the northern reach of Glen Canyon National Recreation Area, in Wayne County of Utah, United States. When viewed from the north-northeast near Labyrinth Canyon, they align to form the shape of a cross, creating the appearance of a single butte. The name "Butte of the Cross" was first applied by John Wesley Powell during the Powell Geographic Expedition of 1869. A few miles further down the Green River, Powell finds that this geographical feature is two buttes when viewed from the east, so it was renamed Buttes of the Cross. It is situated 6.8 miles west of Candlestick Tower, and one-half mile outside the boundary of Canyonlands National Park.

Geology
Buttes of the Cross is composed of hard, fine-grained Wingate Sandstone, which is the remains of wind-borne sand dunes deposited approximately 200 million years ago in the Late Triassic. This Wingate sandstone, capped by Kayenta Formation, forms steep cliffs as it overlays softer layers of the Chinle Formation, which is exposed down to a prominent ledge formed by the Moss Back Member. Slopes below this ledge are Moenkopi Formation, down to the White Rim.  Precipitation runoff drains into the nearby Green River, which in turn is part of the Colorado River drainage basin.

Climbing
The first ascent of the North Butte was made May 25, 1987, by Paul Horton and Lynn Watson via West Chimneys. The South Butte was climbed in 1994 by John Rosholt and Keen Butterworth via The Epicurean route, on the north face.

Gallery

Climate
Spring and fall are the most favorable seasons to visit Buttes of the Cross. According to the Köppen climate classification system, it is located in a Cold semi-arid climate zone, which is defined by the coldest month having an average mean temperature below , and at least 50% of the total annual precipitation being received during the spring and summer.

See also
 Geology of the Canyonlands area
 Colorado Plateau

References

External links

 Weather Forecast: National Weather Service
 Buttes of the Cross photo: Flickr
 Buttes of the Cross photo by Otis R. Marston

Landforms of Wayne County, Utah
Sandstone formations of the United States
Colorado Plateau
Glen Canyon National Recreation Area
Buttes of Utah
Rock formations of Utah